Will Power is the eighth album by Joe Jackson. Released in 1987, it is his first experiment with classical music, continued in later albums including Night Music, Heaven and Hell, and Symphony No. 1.

The album peaked at #131 on the Billboard 200 album chart.

Critical reception
Reviews for Will Power were very mixed. Terry Staunton, writing for New Musical Express, described Will Power as an "accomplished project" which "highlight[s] [the] extremely talented Jackson as a composer and arranger". He questioned the album's commercial potential but added that it would "perhaps lead to a flood of film score commissions". Jane Wilkes of Record Mirror noted Jackson's diversity and said of the album, "You can call it pretentious, call it dramatic, but it's really rather relaxing at the end of the day."

In the US, The New York Times called the album "a major step forward by an English composer and performer who has never remained in one place for long." While praising Jackson's compositional skill (including his "flair for lovely melodic passages and unpredictable, often shimmering arrangements" involving "stunning cascades of sound reminiscent of contemporary composer John Adams"), the Los Angeles Times also wrote that "the lengthy, meandering 'Symphony in One Movement' is as colorless and pretentious as the title suggests." Chris Woodstra of AllMusic retrospectively dismissed Will Power as "a good exercise in self-indulgence but little of anything else"; while Trouser Press described the album as "redolent with unrestrained pomposity... (a) trivial self-indulgence", commenting that "while Jackson may be impressed by his ability to convince an orchestra to play his melodramatically panoramic music, it’s unlikely anyone else will find this exercise especially rewarding."

Track listing 
All songs written, orchestrated and produced by Joe Jackson.

Personnel 
 Joe Jackson - piano on "Nocturne" and "a few small keyboard and percussion overdubs"
 George Manahan - conductor
 Ed Roynesdal - Kurzweil K250 synthesizer, synthesizer programming, sampling and sequencing, electric piano
 Gary Burke - drums
 Pat Rebillot - piano (except on "Nocturne")
 Vinnie Zummo - guitar
 Anthony Jackson - bass guitar (on "Solitude")
 Neil Jason - bass guitar (on "Will Power")
 Tony Aiello - soprano saxophone, alto saxophone, clarinet (solo on "Symphony")
 Chris Hunter - alto saxophone, tenor saxophone
 Steve Slagle - soprano saxophone (on "Solitude")
 Michael Parloff, Laura Conwesser, Andrew Lolya - flute, piccolo
 Susan Trainer - piccolo (on "Solitude")
 Roger Rosenberg, Ray Beckenstein, Charles Russo, Dave Tofani - clarinet, bass clarinet
 Henry Shuman - oboe
 John Campo - bassoon
 Paul Ingraham, Jerry Peel, John Clark, Donal Corrado - French horns
 Michael Morreale, Mel Davis - trumpets
 Dave Taylor, Tom Malone - trombones
 Sue Evans, Dave Carey, David Freidman - percussion
 David Nadien (concertmaster), Charles Libove, Barry Finclair, John Pintavalle, Jan Mullen, Marti Sweet, Arnold Eidus, Richard Sortomme, Matthew Raimondi, Marin Alsop, Gerald Tarack, Regis Iandiorio, Joseph Rabushka, Lew Eley, Jean Ingraham, Marilyn Wright, Masako Yanagita, Al Rogers, Louanne Montesi, Richard Henrickson, David Davis - violins
 Lamar Alsop, Ted Israel, Maureen Gallagher, Carol Landon, Julien Barber, Harry Zaratzian, Sol Greitzer, Sue Pray, Jean Dane - violas
 Charles McCracken, Richard Locker, Warren Lash, Seymour Barab, Jacqueline Mullen, Fred Zlotkin, Jean Leblanc, Diane Barrere, Alla Goldberg - cellos
 Homer Mensch, John Miller, John Beal, Joe Tamosaitis - double bass
 Andrew Zurcher - vocals (on "Solitude")

 Production
 Joe Jackson - orchestration, arrangements, producer and mixing
 Paul Goodman and Michael Frondelli - recording engineer
 Dennis Ferrante - additional engineering

Charts

References

External links 
 Will Power album information at The Joe Jackson Archive

1987 albums
A&M Records albums
Joe Jackson (musician) albums